Sinocyclocheilus jinxiensis is a species of cavefish in the family Cyprinidae
endemic to Xiaolong Spring in Jinxi County, Guangxi, China. In 2016, it was proposed that this species should be moved to its own genus Pseudosinocyclocheilus.

References

Cave fish
Sinocyclocheilus
Fish described in 2012